Kitzmiller may refer to:

People
 John Kitzmiller (1913–1965), African-American actor
 Johnny Kitzmiller (1904–1986), American football player and member of the College Football Hall of Fame
 Karen B. Kitzmiller (1947-2002), American politician
 Warren Kitzmiller (1943-2022), American politician

See also
 Kitzmiller v. Dover Area School District, 2005 United States court case
 Kitzmiller, Maryland, a town in the United States